Anane Boateng Sports Stadium is a multi-use stadium in Kumasi, built by Mr Kwabena Kess the C.E.O of Kessben Group of Companies Ghana at Abrankese near Kuntenase in the Bosomtwe District of Ashanti Region. It is used mostly for football matches and serve as a gathering grounds for thousands of people, mostly members of the Moments of Glory Prayer Army (MOGPA). The stadium is the home stadium of Medeama SC of the Ghana Premier League. The stadium holds 12,000 spectators and opened in 2007.

External links
Stadium information 

Football venues in Ghana
Buildings and structures in Kumasi
Sports venues completed in 2007
Sports venues in Ghana